Acleris chionocentra is a species of moth of the family Tortricidae. It is found in India (Assam, Sikkim) and on Java and Sumatra.

References

Moths described in 1908
chionocentra
Moths of Asia